The Armenia Basketball League A, is the top men's official basketball league in Armenia. The first season of the competition was launched in 2017.

Since 2019, it has been renamed the VBET A-League after a headline sponsorship agreement with the Armenian gambling operator VBET.

History
After the creation of the Armenia national basketball team, the Basketball Federation of Armenia decided to establish the new League A for training new players for the national team.

The Federation also aims to develop national basketball in Armenia by negotiating with other clubs, trying to sign Armenian players which seek to play abroad, and enabling teams to qualify for various European competitions in further seasons.

Current teams (2021-2022)

Finals

Titles by club

See also

 Sport in Armenia

References

External links
League A at Facebook
Armenian basketball at Eurobasket.com

 
Sports leagues in Armenia
Sports leagues established in 2017
2017 establishments in Armenia
Basketball in Armenia
Basketball leagues in Europe